Wolfgang Jenssen (8 October 1942 – 21 October 2022) was a German politician. A member of the Social Democratic Party, he served in the Landtag of Rhineland-Palatinate from 1971 to 1979.

Jenssen died on 21 October 2022, at the age of 80.

References

1942 births
2022 deaths
Social Democratic Party of Germany politicians
Members of the Landtag of Rhineland-Palatinate
Recipients of the Cross of the Order of Merit of the Federal Republic of Germany
People from the Province of Pomerania
People from Słupsk County